Darquba is a village and municipality in the Lankaran Rayon of Azerbaijan. It has a population of 1,365.  The municipality consists of the villages of Darquba and Səbir.

References

Populated places in Lankaran District